Byrd Township is one of the sixteen townships of Brown County, Ohio, United States. The 2010 census found 739 people in the township.

Geography
Located in the southeastern part of the county, it borders the following townships:
Jackson Township - north
Wayne Township, Adams County - northeast
Liberty Township, Adams County - east
Huntington Township - south
Union Township - southwest
Jefferson Township - west

No municipalities are located in Byrd Township, although the unincorporated community of Decatur lies in the township's east.

Name and history
It is the only Byrd Township statewide.

Byrd Township was named for Charles Willing Byrd, the Secretary of Northwest Territory.

Byrd Township had eighteen mills in 1833.

Government
The township is governed by a three-member board of trustees, who are elected in November of odd-numbered years to a four-year term beginning on the following January 1. Two are elected in the year after the presidential election and one is elected in the year before it. There is also an elected township fiscal officer, who serves a four-year term beginning on April 1 of the year after the election, which is held in November of the year before the presidential election. Vacancies in the fiscal officership or on the board of trustees are filled by the remaining trustees.

References

External links
County website

Townships in Brown County, Ohio
Townships in Ohio